The Tomás Rivera Mexican American Children's Book Award recognizes authors and illustrators whose literary work depict the Mexican American experience.  This award was established in 1995 by the Texas State University College of Education in honor of distinguished alumnus, Tomás Rivera an educator, poet and author of literary works depicting the difficulties experienced by Mexican migrant farmers and also the first Mexican American to hold a chancellor position at the University of California.

Criteria 
 The book is written for children and young adults (0–16 years).
 The text and illustrations are of the highest quality.
 The portrayal/representations of Mexican Americans are accurate and engaging, avoid stereotypes, and reflect rich characterization.
 The book may be fiction or non- fiction.

Recipients

External links 
 http://riverabookaward.org/

References 

American literary awards
Hispanic and Latino American literature
Texas State University
Literary awards honoring minority groups
Children's literary awards
American children's literary awards
Young adult literature awards
Awards established in 1995